Selo imeni 8 Marta (8-se Mart isemendäge awıl) is a rural locality (a selo) and the administrative centre of Vosmomartovsky Selsoviet, Yermekeyevsky District, Bashkortostan, Russia. The population was 778 as of 2010.

Geography 
Selo imeni 8 Marta is located 33 km south of Yermekeyevo (the district's administrative centre) by road. Gorodetskoye is the nearest rural locality.

References 

Rural localities in Yermekeyevsky District